Cheonggyesan is a mountain in Gyeonggi-do, South Korea. It extends over the city of Pocheon and the county of Gapyeong.

See also
List of mountains in Korea

Notes

References

Mountains of South Korea
Mountains of Gyeonggi Province
Pocheon
Gapyeong County